Hasin-e Kuchak (also Romanized as Hāsīn-e Kūchak; also known as Hāsūn-e Kūchak) is a village in Chaybasar-e Jonubi Rural District, in the Central District of Maku County, West Azerbaijan Province, Iran. At the 2006 census, its population was 204, in 33 families.

References 

Populated places in Maku County